The Abidjan Stock Exchange (Bourse des Valeurs d'Abidjan), Côte d'Ivoire, was the only stock exchange in the francophone West African countries until the formation of  BRVM in 1998. It was established in 1974, started trading in 1976, and was closed at the end of December 1997.

Stock exchanges in Africa
Companies based in Abidjan
1997 disestablishments in Ivory Coast
Defunct stock exchanges
Ivorian companies established in 1974